Ezio is an Italian masculine name, originating from the Latin name Aetius.

It may refer to:
 Flavius Aetius (c. 396–454), Roman general, after whom Metastasio's libretto and all the operas below are named.
 Ezio (libretto), opera libretto by Metastasio. Notable setting are:
Ezio (Handel), King's Theatre, London 1732
Ezio (Mysliveček, 1775), Naples
Ezio (Mysliveček, 1777), Munich – completely new music
Ezio (Gluck), Prague 1750, revised Vienna 1763
Ezio (Traetta) by Tommaso Traetta, Teatro delle Dame, Rome, 1757
Ezio (Latilla), Naples 1758
 Ezio (band), a band from Cambridge, England
 Ezio Gamba (born 1958), an Italian judoka
 Ezio Mauro (born 1948), an Italian journalist 
 Ézio (footballer) (1966-2011), Ézio Leal Moraes Filho, Brazilian footballer
 Ezio Vanoni (1903–1956), Italian economist and politician
 Ezio Vigorelli (1892–1964), Italian lawyer and politician

Fictional characters 
 Ezio Auditore da Firenze, the protagonist of Ubisoft's Assassin's Creed II, Assassin's Creed Brotherhood and Assassin's Creed Revelations

See also
 Ezio (security), a security solution range for online banking and shopping from Gemalto
 EZ-IO, an intraosseous infusion drill by Vidacare
 Ezio (Flavius Aetius), character from Verdi's Attila (opera)

Italian masculine given names